Fabrizio Degli Afflitti (1572–1613) was a Catholic prelate who served as Bishop of Boiano (1608–1613).

Biography
Fabrizio Degli Afflitti was born in Naples, Italy. On 10 November 1608, he was appointed by Pope Paul V as Bishop of Boiano. On 23 November 1608, he was consecrated bishop by Marcello Lante della Rovere, Bishop of Todi with Giovanni Battista del Tufo, Bishop of Acerra, and Paolo De Curtis, Bishop of Isernia, serving as principal co-consecrators. He served as Bishop of Boiano until his death in 1613.

References

External links and additional sources
 (for Chronology of Bishops) 
 (for Chronology of Bishops) 

1572 births
1613 deaths
17th-century Italian Roman Catholic bishops
Bishops appointed by Pope Paul V